The 1993–94 season was the 95th season of competitive league football in the history of English football club Wolverhampton Wanderers. They played the season in the second tier of the English football system, the Football League First Division.

This season saw the completion of the redevelopment of Molineux which was officially opened on 7 December 1993 to bring the club's highest crowds since the early 1980s. With the expense of the stadium completed by owner Sir Jack Hayward, manager Graham Turner was afforded the biggest budget he had been granted during his tenure but he resigned in March 1994 to end his 7½-year reign with the team in 13th place.

Former England manager Graham Taylor was appointed as Turner's replacement but the team were unable to improve enough to reach the promotion play-offs, ending in 8th place.

Results

Football League First Division

A total of 24 teams competed in the Football League First Division in the 1993–94 season. Each team played every other team twice: once at their stadium, and once at the opposition's. Three points were awarded to teams for each win, one point per draw, and none for defeats. Teams finishing level on points were firstly divided by the number of goals scored rather than goal difference.

Final table

Source: Statto.com

Results summary

Results by round

FA Cup

League Cup

Anglo-Italian Cup

Wolves played in Group 5 of the preliminary round alongside two other domestic First Division clubs. The winner of the group would advance to the main group stage to play both English and Italian opposition. However, Wolves finished in second place in this initial round and so were eliminated.

Players

|-
|align="left"|||align="left"|  †
|0||0||0||0||0||0||0||0||0||0||0||0||
|-
|align="left"|||align="left"| 
|0||0||0||0||0||0||0||0||0||0||0||0||
|-
|align="left"|||align="left"| 
|46||0||5||0||2||0||2||0||55||0||0||0||
|-
|align="left"|||align="left"| 
|0||0||0||0||0||0||1||0||||0||0||0||
|-
|align="left"|||align="left"| 
|35||1||5||1||1||0||2||0||43||2||0||0||
|-
|align="left"|||align="left"|  †
|||0||0||0||0||0||0||0||||0||0||0||
|-
|align="left"|||align="left"|  †
|0||0||0||0||0||0||0||0||0||0||0||0||
|-
|align="left"|||align="left"| 
|||0||0||0||0||0||0||0||style="background:#98FB98"|||0||0||0||
|-
|align="left"|||align="left"| 
|||1||0||0||2||1||0||0||||2||0||0||
|-
|align="left"|||align="left"|  (c)
|39||0||5||0||2||0||1||0||style="background:#98FB98"|47||0||0||0||
|-
|align="left"|||align="left"| 
|||0||0||0||1||0||0||0||||0||0||0||
|-
|align="left"|||align="left"| 
|||3||5||1||0||0||1||0||||4||0||0||
|-
|align="left"|||align="left"| 
|||1||5||0||2||0||2||0||||1||0||0||
|-
|align="left"|||align="left"| 
|||0||0||0||0||0||0||0||||0||0||0||
|-
|align="left"|||align="left"| 
|||1||0||0||1||0||2||0||||1||0||0||
|-
|align="left"|||align="left"|  ¤
|||1||0||0||2||1||2||1||||3||0||0||
|-
|align="left"|||align="left"| 
|||2||||0||1||0||||0||||2||0||0||
|-
|align="left"|||align="left"| 
|||2||||0||0||0||0||0||||2||0||0||
|-
|align="left"|||align="left"| 
|||0||4||0||0||0||0||0||style="background:#98FB98"|||0||0||0||
|-
|align="left"|||align="left"| 
|||7||5||1||2||0||2||1||style="background:#98FB98"|||9||0||0||
|-
|align="left"|||align="left"|  ¤
|||0||0||0||1||0||0||0||||0||0||0||
|-
|align="left"|||align="left"| 
|||0||3||0||0||0||0||0||style="background:#98FB98"|11||0||0||0||
|-
|align="left"|||align="left"| 
|||0||5||0||1||0||2||0||style="background:#98FB98"|||0||0||0||
|-
|align="left"|||align="left"| 
|||4||0||0||0||0||2||0||10||4||0||0||
|-
|align="left"|||align="left"| 
|0||0||0||0||0||0||0||0||0||0||0||0||
|-
|align="left"|FW||align="left"|  ¤
|0||0||0||0||0||0||0||0||0||0||0||0||
|-
|align="left"|FW||align="left"| 
|27||14||2||0||0||0||||1||||15||0||0||
|-
|align="left"|FW||align="left"| 
|||11||5||2||2||0||1||1||style="background:#98FB98"|||14||0||0||
|-
|align="left"|FW||align="left"| 
|||1||1||1||1||0||1||1||style="background:#98FB98"|||3||0||0||
|-
|align="left"|FW||align="left"|  †
|0||0||0||0||0||0||0||0||0||0||0||0||
|-
|align="left"|FW||align="left"| 
|||2||||0||0||0||1||0||style="background:#98FB98"|||2||0||0||
|-
|align="left"|FW||align="left"|  ¤
|0||0||0||0||0||0||0||0||0||0||0||0||
|-
|align="left"|FW||style="background:#faecc8" align="left"|  ‡
|||1||0||0||1||0||0||0||style="background:#98FB98"|||1||0||0||
|-
|align="left"|FW||style="background:#faecc8" align="left"|  ‡
|13||8||1||0||0||0||0||0||style="background:#98FB98"|14||8||0||0||
|}
Source: Wolverhampton Wanderers: The Complete Record

Transfers

In

Out

Loans in

Loans out

Management and coaching staff

Kit
The season brought a new home kit as the design returned to a plain gold shirt with black collar. The away kit, a bright blue shirt with black bands and gold trim on the upper arms, was retained from the previous season. Both were manufactured by the club's own "Molineux" label and sponsored by Goodyear.

References

1993–94
Wolverhampton Wanderers